Events in the year 1922 in Norway.

Incumbents
Monarch – Haakon VII

Events

 8 January – The Social Democratic Youth League of Norway is founded.
 30 November – The establishment of Norwegian government-owned alcoholic beverage retailer "Vinmonopolet".
 Fridtjof Nansen is awarded the Nobel Peace Prize for his work as a League of Nations High Commissioner.
 Municipal and county elections are held throughout the country.

Popular culture

Sports

Ole Reistad, pentathlete, is awarded the Egebergs Ærespris for achievements in multiple sports.

Music

Film

Literature
The Olav Duun novel I ungdommen (Odin Grows Up) from the work Juvikfolket (The People of Juvik, 1918–23), was published.

Notable births
6 January – Finn Mortensen, composer, critic and educator (died 1983)
15 January – Eva Bull Holte, painter and printmaker (died 1993).
20 January – Bjørn Endreson, actor, stage producer and theatre director (died 1998)
25 January
Just Faaland, political economist (died 2017)
Kåre Tveter, painter (died 2012)
2 February – Sigbjørn Hølmebakk, author (died 1981)
11 February – Svenn Stray, politician and Minister (died 2012)
13 February – Jørgen Sønstebø, politician (died 2013)
10 March – Dagmar Lahlum, resistance member and agent (died 1999)
15 March – Kristoffer Lepsøe, rower and Olympic bronze medallist (died 2006)
8 April – Odd Steinar Holøs, politician (died 2001)
14 April – Viking Olver Eriksen, nuclear physicist (died 2014)
30 April – Frank Olsen, resistance member, executed (died 1945)
16 May – Norveig Karlsen, gymnast (died 1993)
18 May – Gerda Boyesen, founder of Biodynamic Psychology (died 2005)
29 May – Edith Roger, dancer, choreographer and stage director. (died 2023)
7 June – Vilhelm Aubert, sociologist (died 1988)
10 June – Edvard Hagerup Bull, composer (died 2012)
10 June – Erling Danielsen, politician (died 2010)
13 June – Gunnar Konsmo, speed skater (died 1996)
14 June – Sven Olsen, politician (died 2001)
26 June – Reidun Andersson, politician (died 1992)
28 June – Jostein Goksøyr, microbiologist (died 2000)
6 July – Thorolf Rafto, human rights activist and professor in Economic History (died 1986)
7 July – Reidar Torp, Norwegian military officer (died 2017)
8 July – Torodd Hauer, speed skater (died 2010)
17 July – Olina Storsand, politician
24 July – Per Hansson, journalist and writer (died 1982)
26 July – Johan Trondsen, politician (died 2018)
27 July – Ambjørg Sælthun, politician (died 2012)
7 September – Bodil Aakre, jurist and politician (died 2008)
28 September – Liv Dommersnes, actress and reciter of poetry (died 2014)
2 October – Hallvard Rieber-Mohn, writer and Dominican priest (died 1982)
8 October – Helge Stormorken, veterinarian and physician (died 2019)
20 October – Kjell Bloch Sandved, author, lecturer and nature photographer (died 2015)
4 November – Reidar Due, politician
12 November – Knut Østby, sprint canoer and Olympic silver medallist (died 2010)
13 November – Aud Schønemann, actress (died 2006)
22 December – Odd Wang Sørensen, international soccer player (died 2004)
28 December – Ragnar Christiansen, politician and Minister (died 1994)

Deaths

7 January – Jørg Tofte Jebsen, physicist (born 1888)
23 January – Stephan Sinding, sculptor (born 1846)
6 February – Kyrre Grepp, politician (born 1879)
14 February – Magnus Halvorsen, politician (born 1853)
22 February – Frithjof Olsen, gymnast and Olympic silver medallist (born 1882)
7 March – Axel Thue, mathematician (born 1863)
10 March – Anton Johan Rønneberg, politician (born 1856)
3 April – Aasulv Olsen Bryggesaa, politician and Minister (born 1866)
18 April – Hjalmar Welhaven, architect, palace manager, and sportsman (born 1850)
5 May – Carl Sofus Lumholtz, discoverer and ethnographer (born 1851)
13 June – Fredrik Stang Lund, politician and Minister (born 1859)
21 August – Jørgen Løvland, politician and Prime Minister of Norway (born 1848)
5 September – Alvilde Prydz, novelist (born 1846)
7 September – Hans G. Jensen, tailor, trade unionist and politician (born 1856)
27 October – Hans Henrik Reusch, geologist (born 1852)
25 December – Jørgen Christian Knudsen, ship-owner and politician (born 1843)

See also

References

External links